Come Play is a 2020 American horror thriller film written and directed by Jacob Chase, based on his own short film titled Larry. The film stars Gillian Jacobs, John Gallagher Jr., Azhy Robertson, and Winslow Fegley.

Come Play was released in the United States on October 30, 2020, by Focus Features. The film received mixed reviews from critics and grossed $13 million against a budget of $9 million.

Plot  
Oliver is a young non-verbal autistic boy who uses a smartphone to communicate with people. He attends school and is mostly taken care of by his mother, Sarah; his father Marty spends most of his time at work trying to make ends meet. Sarah and Marty's marriage has become difficult to the extent that Marty moves out. One night Oliver sees an app on his smartphone, "Misunderstood Monsters", narrating the story of a monster named Larry who "just wants a friend". After he reads the story, lights go out by themselves. He plays with an app on his tablet that identifies faces, and it identifies a face in the empty space next to him. At school, Oliver is bullied by his classmates due to his condition. They lure him into a field and take his phone, throwing it out into the field.

One night, Sarah organizes a sleepover so Oliver can become more social. The three boys who bullied him come over. Oliver hides the tablet as he is terrified of it. One of the boys retrieves the tablet and reads the story. The lights go out and Larry appears, but he can only be seen through the tablet's camera. Larry attacks Byron, one of the boys, and the terrified boys all blame Oliver for the incident. In the following days, Sarah begins to see the same strange things Oliver did. Through Oliver's tablet, Larry says he wants to take Oliver back to his home world.

That night, Marty takes Oliver to his night-shift parking lot attendant job. Larry, revealing as a skeletal creature similar to a ghoul, begins to stalk them. When Marty witnesses Larry picking Oliver off from the ground, he finally believes Sarah and Oliver. They break the tablet and assume everything is over. Byron is traumatized from the incident at Oliver's house but comes clean on what really happened, absolving Oliver of blame. It is revealed that Byron and Oliver were once good friends but their friendship ended badly because Oliver accidentally hurt Byron which also caused their moms to break up their friendship. They both reconcile, with Oliver and Byron becoming friends again.

One night at work, Marty is attacked by Larry, who can travel through electricity and usually communicates with people through screens. Marty is hurt but alive. Larry proceeds to attack Oliver at his house, intending to take the boy. Sarah trashes all electrical devices in the house, but the TV finishes playing Larry's story before she can shut it off. Larry takes physical form, being able to move in real life without the use of a screen, and begins to stalk them throughout the house. Oliver takes Sarah to the field where there is no electricity for Larry to follow them with, but Larry uses Oliver's phone that the boys threw earlier to trap them there.

Oliver must take Larry's hand to enter Larry's world, but at the last second, Sarah takes Larry's hand instead, offering to go with him and become his friend instead of Oliver. In their final moments, Oliver looks Sarah in the eye for the first time, something Sarah has struggled with ever since Oliver was diagnosed. Larry takes Sarah and they both vanish, leaving Oliver alone. In the aftermath, Oliver lives with Marty, and they intend to deal with their loss. Marty gets more involved with Oliver's therapy.

One night, the lights go out again and strange noises are heard downstairs. Marty grabs his phone and sees Oliver and Sarah (who has been taken by Larry and seemingly lives in his world) playing happily. Sarah tells her son "I'll protect you", as Marty smiles. Larry's fate is left unknown.

Cast
Azhy Robertson as Oliver, an autistic boy
Gillian Jacobs as Sarah, Oliver's mother
John Gallagher Jr. as Marty, Oliver's father
Winslow Fegley as Byron, Oliver's former friend
Rachel Wilson as Jennifer, Byron's mother
Jayden Marine as Mateo, one of Oliver's new friends
Gavin MacIver-Wright as Zach, one of Oliver's new friends
Eboni Booth as Dr. Robyn, a speech therapist
Dalmar Abuzeid as Mr. Calarco, a teacher

Production
It was announced in October 2018 that Jacob Chase would write and direct a film adaptation of his short film Larry. In September 2018, Gillian Jacobs and Azhy Robertson were cast in the film, and in November 2018, John Gallagher Jr. was added as well.

Release
Come Play was theatrically released in the United States on October 30, 2020. It was previously scheduled to be released on July 24, 2020, but the release was rescheduled due to the COVID-19 pandemic. The studio spent "in the high single digit million range" promoting the film.

Home media 
Come Play was released on DVD and Blu-ray on January 26, 2021 by Universal Pictures Home Entertainment.

Reception

Box office 
Come Play grossed $10.5 million in the United States and Canada, and $2.7 million in other territories, for a worldwide total of $13.2 million.

The film grossed $1 million from 2,183 theaters on its first day, including $150,000 from Thursday night previews. It went on to debut to $3.2 million, over the October 30–November 1 Halloween weekend, coming in slightly above projections and topping the box office. The film fell 45% to $1.7 million in its second weekend, finishing second, after fellow Focus Features release Let Him Go, and then made $1.1 million in its third weekend.

Critical response 
The website's critics consensus reads, "A frightening feature debut from Jacob Chase, Come Play makes up for its uneven tone by adding real depth to its jarring scares." On Metacritic, the film has a weighted average score of 58 out of 100, based on 21 critics, indicating "mixed or average reviews". Audiences polled by CinemaScore gave the film an average grade of "B−" on an A+ to F scale, while PostTrak reported 60% of audience members gave the film a positive score, with 40% saying they would definitely recommend it.

David Ehrlich, writing for IndieWire, gave the film a "C−" grade, writing, "merely serviceable, [the film] leaves you with the feeling that a much better game was lost in the shuffle." The A.V. Clubs A. A. Dowd gave it a "B" and called it "an Amblin entertainment in the purest, classic sense." In Varietys review, Courtney Howard stated, "The title stands as a beckoning call to audiences to join in the devilish delights he's conjured. Yet the scares in the tale fail to scale from a mobile device to the big screen."

References

External links
 

2020 films
2020 horror films
2020 horror thriller films
2020s American films
2020s English-language films
2020s monster movies
American dark fantasy films
American horror thriller films
American monster movies
American supernatural horror films
Features based on short films
Films about mobile phones
Films about autism
Films postponed due to the COVID-19 pandemic
Films scored by Roque Baños
Focus Features films
Giant monster films
Horror film remakes
Reliance Entertainment films
Supernatural fantasy films
Supernatural thriller films